OK Fine, 'To Ang Gusto Nyo! is a Philippine sitcom on ABS-CBN. It aired from May 14, 2002, to August 21, 2006, replacing Attagirl. The show was originally planned as a movie but the ABS-CBN management decided to make a sitcom out of it due to the movie's popular line "OK Fine, Whatever". The final season was entitled OK Fine, Oh Yes!.

Cast
Aga Muhlach as Michael (2002–2006)
Edu Manzano as Junior (2003–2006)
Bayani Agbayani as Miguel (2002–2006)
Rica Peralejo as Ikay (2002–2006)
Gloria Romero as Barbie (2002–2006)
Nikki Valdez as Camilla (2002–2006)
Michelle Bayle as Ruby (2002)
Heart Evangelista as Yoko (2002–2004)
Onyok Velasco as Dong (2002–2006)
Christian Vasquez as Rocky (2002)
Arron Villaflor as Arron (2005)
Erich Gonzales as Erich (2005)
Mariel Rodriguez as Mariel (2003)
Sharlene San Pedro as Sharlene (2004)
Tado† (2004)
John Estrada (2004)

References

See also
List of programs broadcast by ABS-CBN

ABS-CBN original programming
2002 Philippine television series debuts
2006 Philippine television series endings
Philippine television sitcoms
Filipino-language television shows